Offutt Lake is a lake in the U.S. state of Washington. The community of Offutt Lake surrounds the area. 

Offutt Lake was named after Levi and Milford Offutt, early settlers.

See also
List of lakes in Washington

References

Lakes of Thurston County, Washington
Lakes of Washington (state)